Revs is a 1985 Formula Three simulation written initially for the BBC Micro by Geoff Crammond and published by Acornsoft that is notable for its realistic simulation of the sport and as a precursor to its author's later work on Formula One Grand Prix and its sequels. Technical consultancy was provided by Formula Three driver David Hunt, whom Acornsoft's parent company Acorn Computers had sponsored during the British Formula Three Championship.

Gameplay

Unlike most contemporaneous racing games, Revs features selection of aerodynamic settings by the player and a full three-dimensional environment. The player is allowed to drive the wrong way around the track or even away from it completely. Unusual for the time, the track and terrain are not planar, but undulations in the ground are reproduced. The game was noted for its use of the BBC's hardware in achieving its display: such was the difficulty in squeezing the game into the BBC's limited memory, part of the game code actually occupies part of the screen memory.  Whilst this would ordinarily be distractingly visible, timer-based manipulation of the BBC's display palette has the effect of turning all the 'code pixels' blue, thus hiding it in the game's sky.

The game features rudimentary AI for control of the opponents' cars, which are driven by individual characters with humorous names. Johnny Turbo, Max Throttle and Gloria Slap are usually the fastest opponents, whereas Miles Behind is often the slowest.

The BBC Micro version release features Silverstone as its one track. There is also an expansion pack, Revs 4 Tracks (released in 1985), which adds Brands Hatch, Donington Park, Oulton Park and Snetterton to make a total of five.

Reception

Acorn's marketing for the game included racing sponsorship, with driver David Hunt being sponsored in the 1984 British Formula Three Championship Acorn Computer European Trophy.

Legacy

Enhanced release

An enhanced edition of the BBC version was released in 1986 by Superior Software/Acornsoft as Revs plus Revs 4 Tracks which included all 5 tracks. The enhanced edition also included a 'steering assist' driving aid "designed to improve control of the car when using keys or a digital joystick".

Ports

Revs was later ported to the Commodore 64, with the standard game providing the Silverstone and Brands Hatch tracks. The '4 Tracks' pack for the Commodore (released under the title Revs +) included the Nürburgring, Oulton Park, Snetterton and Donington Park circuits.

References

External links 
The 

Revs at C64Sets.com
REVS - The Birth of Sim Racing, documentary by GPLaps at YouTube

1984 video games
Acornsoft games
BBC Micro and Acorn Electron games
Commodore 64 games
Formula Three
Racing simulators
Superior Software games
Telecomsoft games
Video games developed in the United Kingdom
Video games with expansion packs
Single-player video games